George Raymond Culver (born July 8, 1943), is an American former professional baseball

Early career
Culver was offered $1,000 to sign with the Phillies following an outstanding high school career at North High School in Bakersfield, California, where he played five sports. He turned that down and instead went to Bakersfield College and excelled in baseball for two years.

Major league career
Culver was signed by the New York Yankees as an amateur free agent in 1963 for $2,500. He made his major league debut at age 23 on September 7, 1966, as the Indians' starting pitcher against Jim Lonborg and the Boston Red Sox at Cleveland Municipal Stadium. Culver pitched five innings and gave up five earned runs in a 5–4 loss; the first-ever major league hitter he faced was José Tartabull.

Culver pitched a no-hitter for the Reds on July 29, 1968, in a 6–1 win over the Phillies at Philadelphia's Connie Mack Stadium. Culver struck out four batters and walked five as he outdueled Chris Short in game two of a doubleheader.

In 1973, Culver appeared in 28 games (all in relief) for the Los Angeles Dodgers, posting a 4–4 record and a 3.00 ERA before getting placed on waivers in August. Though Culver was the last pitcher on the Dodger depth chart, teammate Tommy John thought his dismissal was a big reason Los Angeles missed the playoffs in 1973. "George didn't get into a lot of games, but he held a vital role as team comic. His antics kept guys loose and kept us in a good frame of mind. When they released him...it upset the chemistry of the team. We couldn't believe it. It was like cutting out our heart."

Minor league coach, manager
After retiring as a player, Culver spent 30 years as a minor league manager, pitching coordinator and pitching coach in the Dodgers and Phillies organizations. His last season in professional baseball was as a roving pitching coach for the Dodgers in 2010. On his last day as an active coach, the Bakersfield Blaze minor league team honored him with a "George Culver Retirement Night" on August 23, 2010.

Personal life
For many years he has been supporter of Bakersfield College, which started when he began the BC Baseball Hot Stove Dinner as a means to upgrade the baseball facilities. The Hot Stove dinners generated over $1 million, which provided lights for the BC baseball field, a state-of-the-art clubhouse with showers, restrooms, laundry facilities, lockers, and coaches offices along with two new scoreboards and dugouts. His work in the Bakersfield community, especially through the nonprofit Light Brigade, has also helped raise money for the California State University, Bakersfield baseball program plus help for the local high schools and various youth baseball groups. He brought baseball to the Police Athletic League for inner-city kids in the Bakersfield area and has raised funds to purchase equipment and helped coach players in the PAL program.

In 2012, he was inducted into the California Community College Athletics Association Hall of Fame. He was previously inducted into Kern County's Bob Elias Hall of Fame and the Bakersfield College Alumni Hall of Fame.

Culver lives in Bakersfield, California, with his wife of 36 years, Rosie, and he has three adult stepchildren.

See also 
 List of Major League Baseball no-hitters

References

External links

George Culver at Astros Daily
George Culver at Pura Pelota (Venezuelan Professional Baseball League)

1943 births
American expatriate baseball players in Japan
Bakersfield Outlaws players
Baseball players from California
Charleston Indians players
Cincinnati Reds players
Cleveland Indians players
Fort Lauderdale Yankees players
Greensboro Yankees players
Houston Astros players
Industriales de Valencia players
Living people
Los Angeles Dodgers players
Major League Baseball pitchers
Nippon Ham Fighters players
Oklahoma City 89ers players
Philadelphia Phillies players
Portland Beavers players
Reading Phillies managers
Reading Phillies players
St. Louis Cardinals players
Shelby Colonels players
Sportspeople from Salinas, California
Toledo Mud Hens players